Terry F. Gestrin is an American politician serving as a member of the Idaho House of Representatives from the 8th district. He assumed office on August 2, 2012.

Early life and education
Gestrin was born in Cascade, Idaho. He earned a Bachelor of Business Administration degree in finance from Idaho State University.

Career
After redistricting in 2012, Gestrin sought the 8th district seat in the Idaho Senate but was defeated in the May 2012 Republican primary by then-Representative Steven Thayn.

When Representative Ken Roberts was appointed to the Idaho State Tax Commission later in July, the Legislative District 8 Republican Central Committee selected Gestrin to take Roberts' place on the general election ballot for Seat A.

Governor Otter appointed Gestrin to serve the remainder of Roberts' term.

Committee assignments
Education Committee
Resources and Conservation Committee
Transportation and Defense Committee

Elections

References

External links
 Terry Gestrin at legislature.idaho.gov
Campaign site

Year of birth missing (living people)
Living people
Idaho State University alumni
Republican Party members of the Idaho House of Representatives
People from Cascade, Idaho
21st-century American politicians